Musication is the second album by the Japanese hip-hop group Home Made Kazoku, released in 2006. The album reached #3 on the Oricon weekly charts, making it the highest charted album of the group.

Background
After their previous successful album Rock the World, the group recorded their next album in 2005. Their first single Shōnen Heart (which was used as the second intro theme for the TV anime Eureka 7) reached #14 on the Oricon weekly charts. The group released Joyride in October 2005, reached #20 on the weekly charts. Salvia no Tsubomi which they released in January 2006, was the highest charted single of the album, reached #12 and charted for eleven weeks. Of special note, tickets to their "Musication" tour in 2006, were sold out within the span of one hour, a record in Japanese music.

Track listing

2006 albums
Home Made Kazoku albums